The Mongolia national football team (Mongolyn khölbömbögiin ündesnii shigshee bag) represents Mongolia in international football and is controlled by the Mongolian Football Federation.

Founded in 1959, the association was inactive between 1960 and 1998 when the team did not feature in any international fixtures. The Mongolian Football Federation is a member of the Asian Football Confederation and the East Asian Football Federation. The team has never participated in the FIFA World Cup, and the only major international tournaments the team has taken part in are the 2016 AFC Solidarity Cup and 1998 Asian Games, not progressing past the group state in either competition.

History

Mongolia's first international fixture was a 12-0 loss to Japan during a match in Manchukuo in 1942. Between 1960 and 1998, the Mongolia team played no international matches before being accepted as a FIFA member in 1998. Mongolia's first competitive matches were in the 1998 Asian Games qualifiers where they were heavily defeated by Kuwait 11–0, and by Uzbekistan 15–0.

They entered qualification for the 2002 FIFA World Cup, but lost their opening five matches before drawing 2–2 with Bangladesh, securing a single point. In the 2006 World Cup qualifiers, Mongolia was drawn against the Maldives and though they remained competitive after the first leg, only losing 1–0 at home, they were crushed in the second leg in Malé 12-0 and eliminated. In the first round of the 2010 World Cup qualifiers, Mongolia was beaten 9–2 on aggregate by North Korea, and four years later in the 2014 qualifiers, Mongolia lost to Myanmar 2–1. Mongolia then lost in the 2018 World Cup qualifiers to Timor-Leste; however, they were later awarded two 3–0 victories as Timor-Leste had fielded numerous ineligible players. Unfortunately this came after the second round matches had been played; therefore, Mongolia did not advance in the competition.

Mongolia succeeded in qualifying past the first round for the first time in the 2022 FIFA World Cup qualifiers by beating Brunei 3–2 over two legs. In the second round, following a 14–0 defeat to Japan on 30 March 2021, they let head coach Rastislav Božik go and hired Shuichi Mase as their new head coach. In their next game on 7 June, Mongolia managed to shock Kyrgyzstan 1–0 for their first ever win against a Central Asian and a top-100 ranked opponent in a FIFA qualifier.

EAFF suspension
According to the voting outcome at the AFC Congress held in January 2011, the Mongolian Football Federation was suspended to conduct any activities at the EAFF until the EAFF Ordinary Congress of March 2014. They were welcomed back to the federation at the 7th Ordinary Congress and 41st and 42nd Executive Committee Meeting of the EAFF.

Team image

Nicknames 
The Mongolian national team is often nicknamed the Blue Wolves. The blue wolf is a symbol of Turkic and Mongolian people, and originates from the Mongolian legend of the blue wolf. The team has also been known as the "Shegshee", which translates as "national team" in Mongolian.

Kits and crest 
Currently, the Mongolian national football team uses an all-white uniform as their first colours, and a blue uniform as their second colours. In August 2021 it was announced that Mongolian sportswear company TG Sport had signed a two-year deal with the Mongolian Football Federation to provide kits for all Mongolian national teams.

Home stadium 
Mongolia plays their home matches at the MFF Football Centre, a 5,000 capacity stadium in Ulaanbaatar. The stadium boasts an artificial playing surface.

Results and fixtures

2022

2023

Coaching staff

Coaching statistics

Players

Current squad
 The following players were called up for the 2023 AFC Asian Cup qualification matches.
 Match dates: 8, 11 and 14 June 2022
 Opposition: ,  and 
 Caps and goals correct as of:' 14 June 2022, after the match against .

Recent call-ups
The following players have also been called up to the Mongolia squad within the last twelve months.

INJ Withdrew due to injury
PRE Preliminary squad / standby
RET Retired from the national team
SUS Serving suspension
WD Player withdrew from the squad due to non-injury issue.

RecordsPlayers in bold are still active with Mongolia.''

Competitive record

FIFA World Cup

AFC Asian Cup

AFC Solidarity Cup

AFC Challenge Cup

Asian Games

EAFF E-1 Football Championship

References

External links
 MFF Official website
 FIFA profile
 AFC profile
 Mongolian Football Central

https://www.worldfootball.net/teams/mongolei-team/21/

 
Asian national association football teams